Frankenberger is a German language habitational surname denoting a person originally living in any one of several settlements named Frankenberg ("mountain of the Franks") and may refer to:
Andy Frankenberger, American poker player
J. T. Frankenberger (born 1935), former Canadian football player
Sebastian Frankenberger (born 1981), former German politician
Uwe Frankenberger (born 1955), German politician
Zdenek Frankenberger (1892–1966), Czech malacologist

References 

German-language surnames
German toponymic surnames